The Player is the second studio album recorded by the American female vocal trio First Choice, released in 1974 on the Philly Groove label.

Chart history
The album features the title track, which peaked at #70 on the Billboard Hot 100 and #7 on the Hot Soul Singles. Another single, "Guilty", had moderate success on the charts.

Track listing

Personnel
Norman Harris, Bobby Eli, Herb Smith, Ronald L. Smith – guitars
Ronnie Baker, Barry Gibson – bass
Earl Young, Jerry Goldsmith – drums
Larry Washington – congas and bongos
Ron Kersey – piano and organ
Prime Cut – rhythm on "Guilty" and "All I Need Is Time"
Don Renaldo & the Sound of Philadelphia Strings (Albert Barone, Charles Apollonia, Angelo Petrella, Diane Barnett, Romeo Di Stefano, Rudy Malizia, Joe Donofrio, Christine Reeves) – strings
Davis Barnett, Angelo Petrella – violas
Romeo Di Stefano – cello
Rocco Bene, Robert Hartzell – horns and trumpets
Fred Linge, Richard Genovese, Edward Cascarella – bass trombones
Fred Joiner – tenor trombone
Leno Zachery – alto saxophone
Danny Williams – French horn

Charts

Singles

References

External links
 

1974 albums
First Choice (band) albums
Albums produced by Norman Harris
Albums recorded at Sigma Sound Studios
Philly Groove Records albums